Columbus was a tender locomotive operated by the Leipzig–Dresden Railway Company (Leipzig-Dresdner Eisenbahn or LDE).

History 
The locomotive was sent to the LDE on the recommendation of the Saxon consul in the United States. Similar locomotives had already proven themselves on the Baltimore and Ohio Railroad. (cf. Tom Thumb) She was built in 1835 by Gillingham & Winans in Baltimore/USA.

In the LDE's company records the locomotive was later described as unreliable and unusable. Several attempts to give the engine back to the manufacturer failed.

In 1842 the locomotive was given to the  Sächsische Maschinenbau-Compagnie in Chemnitz in payment for the PEGASUS. Beyond that, her fate is unknown. She may be identical with the TEUTONIA, which was delivered to the Magdeburg-Leipzig Railway in 1843.

See also 
Royal Saxon State Railways
List of Saxon locomotives and railbuses
Leipzig–Dresden Railway Company

References

Sources 
 
 
 

0-4-0 locomotives
Locomotives of Saxony
Early steam locomotives
Standard gauge locomotives of Germany
Railway locomotives introduced in 1835